Wilderness is a seaside town on the Garden Route of the southern Cape in South Africa. It is situated a short distance to the east from the city of George, on the N2 down the Kaaiman's River Pass.

The area around Wilderness has yielded significant palaeoclimatological data on the prehistoric climate of South Africa. Sediment core data from the nearby coastal lake Eilandvlei indicate higher aridity relative to the present day during the intervals spanning ~8,900-7,900 years BP and ~6,400-3,000 years BP, whereas the interval from 7,900 to 6,400 years BP was relatively moist and similar to the present day.

References

External links

Populated places in the George Local Municipality